The 1905 Nevada State Sagebrushers football team was an American football team that represented Nevada State University (now known as the University of Nevada, Reno) as an independent during the 1905 college football season. The team did not have a head coach.

Schedule

References

Nevada State
Nevada Wolf Pack football seasons
College football winless seasons
Nevada State Sagebrushers football